The Grand Prix of ISD was a one-day road cycling race held in Ukraine in 2015 and 2016, as part of the UCI Europe Tour as a category 1.2 race.

Winners

References

UCI Europe Tour races
Recurring sporting events established in 2015
2015 establishments in Ukraine
Recurring sporting events disestablished in 2016
2016 disestablishments in Ukraine
Cycle races in Ukraine
Sport in Vinnytsia
Summer events in Ukraine
Defunct cycling races in Ukraine